Andrey Medvedev (born April 6, 1990) is a USSR-born Israeli artistic gymnast. He won the bronze medal at the 2021 World Artistic Gymnastics Championships in Vault and two silver medals in Vault at the 2019 and the 2021 European Championships.

Early life
Medvedev was born in Soviet Union in 1990. He grew up in the city of Ulyanovsk. Enrolled in gymnastics at the age of 6. When he was 12 years old, Medvedev immigrated with his family to Israel. Then resided in Haifa, Israel, and in 2013 moved to Tel Aviv, Israel, to join the local club of Maccabi Tel Aviv.

Career
In April 2014, Medvedev won his first medal in a world tour competition when he won a silver medal in vault at the 'Ljubljana World Cup' with the score of 14.975. In May 2017, he won a gold medal at the 'Koper World Cup' after scoring 14.975 in vault. Later that year, he won a bronze medal at the 'Osijek World Cup'. 

At the 2017 Maccabiah Games, he won three gold medals.

At the 2018 European Championships held in Glasgow, he finished 5th in vault after scoring 14.266. In May of that year, he won a gold medal in vault at the Osijek World Cup with the score of 14.667.

At the 2019 European Championships held in Szczecin, he won the silver medal in vault after scoring 14.699 in the final.

In 2021, he won a bronze medal in the men's vault at the Artistic Gymnastics World Championships.

At the 2022 Maccabiah Games, he was part of the Team Israel squad that won the gold medal in the open men’s team.

References

External links
 
 
 

1990 births
Living people
Israeli male artistic gymnasts
Russian emigrants to Israel
European Games competitors for Israel
Gymnasts at the 2019 European Games
Competitors at the 2017 Maccabiah Games
Competitors at the 2022 Maccabiah Games
Maccabiah Games medalists in gymnastics
Maccabiah Games gold medalists for Israel
Maccabiah Games silver medalists for Israel
Medalists at the World Artistic Gymnastics Championships